Sarv Kola (also Romanized as Sarv Kolā and Sarv Kalā) is a village in Hasan Reza Rural District, in the Central District of Juybar County, Mazandaran Province, Iran. At the 2006 census, its population was 1,328, in 357 families.

References 

Populated places in Juybar County